Cyrille C. Verbrugge (9 November 1866 – 4 May 1929) was a Belgian fencer. He won two gold medals at the 1906 Intercalated Games.

References

External links
 

1866 births
1929 deaths
Belgian male fencers
Belgian épée fencers
Belgian sabre fencers
Olympic fencers of Belgium
Olympic gold medalists for Belgium
Medalists at the 1906 Intercalated Games
Fencers at the 1900 Summer Olympics
Fencers at the 1906 Intercalated Games
People from Mouscron
Sportspeople from Hainaut (province)